The following outline is provided as an overview of and topical guide to the Philippines:

General reference 

Pronunciation: 
Abbreviations: PH or PHL
Common English country name: Philippines, the Philippines
Official English country name: Republic of the Philippines
Common endonyms: Philippines, Pilipinas, Pinas (informal)
Official endonym: Republic of the Philippines, Republika ng Pilipinas
Common exonyms: the Philippines, the Philippine Islands (archaic)
Adjectivals: Philippine, Filipino
Demonyms: Filipino (masculine or neutral; among others), Filipina (feminine)
Etymology: named after Philip II of Spain
International rankings of the Philippines
ISO country codes: PH, PHL, 608
ISO region codes: See ISO 3166-2:PH
Internet country code top-level domain: .ph

Geography of the Philippines 

 The Philippines is: an archipelagic megadiverse island country
 Location:
 Northern Hemisphere and Eastern Hemisphere
 Eurasia
 Asia
 Southeast Asia
 Maritime Southeast Asia
 Time zone: Philippine Standard Time (UTC+08)
 Extreme points of the Philippines
 North: Mavulis (Y'Ami) Island, Itbayat, Batanes 
 South: Frances Reef, Sitangkai, Tawi-Tawi 
 East: Pusan Point, Caraga, Davao Oriental 
 West: Balabac Great Reef, Balabac, Palawan 
 Subject to territorial dispute: Thitu Island, Kalayaan, Palawan 
 High: Mount Apo 
 Low: Philippine Sea and South China Sea 
 Land boundaries: none
 Coastline:  – 5th longest coastline
 Population: 109,035,343 (2020 census) 13th most populous country
 Area:  – 72nd most extensive country
 Atlas of the Philippines
 Cities in the Philippines by population

Environment of the Philippines 

 Beaches of the Philippines
 Climate of the Philippines
 Environmental issues in the Philippines
 Ecoregions in the Philippines
 Renewable energy in the Philippines
 Geology of the Philippines
 Headlands of the Philippines
 National Parks of the Philippines
 Protected areas of the Philippines
 Wildlife of the Philippines
 Flora of the Philippines
 Fauna of the Philippines
 Birds of the Philippines
 List of endemic birds of the Philippines
 Mammals of the Philippines
 List of endangered species of the Philippines

Geographic features of the Philippines 
 Bays of the Philippines
 Islands of the Philippines
 Island groups of the Philippines
 Lakes in the Philippines
 Laguna de Bay
 Lake Bato
 Lake Buluan
 Lake Lanao
 Lake Lumao
 Lake Mainit
 Naujan Lake
 Taal Lake
 Mountains of the Philippines
 Chocolate Hills
 Cordillera Central
 Mount Apo
 Mount Arayat
 Mount Banahaw
 Mount Halcon
 Mount Hibok-Hibok
 Mount Iriga
 Mount Isarog
 Mount Madja-as
 Mount Makiling
 Mount Malepunyo
 Mount Pinatubo
 Mount Pulag
 Mount Sembrano
 Sierra Madre Mountains
 Zambales Mountains
 Volcanoes of the Philippines
 Active volcanoes in the Philippines
 Potentially active volcanoes in the Philippines
 Inactive volcanoes in the Philippines
 Rivers of the Philippines
 Agno River
 Agusan River
 Angat River
 Bicol River
 Cagayan River
 Marikina River
 Pampanga River
 Pasig River
 Sibagat River
 Wawa River
 Waterfalls of the Philippines
 World Heritage Sites in the Philippines
 Peninsulas of the Philippines

Island groups of the Philippines 

 Luzon
 Visayas
 Mindanao

Administrative divisions of the Philippines

Regions of the Philippines 

 Bangsamoro Autonomous Region in Muslim Mindanao
 Bicol Region
 Cagayan Valley
 Calabarzon
 Caraga
 Central Luzon
 Central Visayas
 Cordillera Administrative Region
 Davao Region
 Eastern Visayas
 Ilocos Region
 Mimaropa
 National Capital Region
 Northern Mindanao
 Soccsksargen
 Western Visayas
 Zamboanga Peninsula

Provinces of the Philippines 

 Abra
 Agusan del Norte
 Agusan del Sur
 Aklan
 Albay
 Antique
 Apayao
 Aurora
 Basilan
 Bataan
 Batanes
 Batangas
 Benguet
 Biliran
 Bohol
 Bukidnon
 Bulacan
 Cagayan
 Camarines Norte
 Camarines Sur
 Camiguin
 Capiz
 Catanduanes
 Cavite
 Cebu
 Cotabato
 Davao de Oro
 Davao del Norte
 Davao del Sur
 Davao Occidental
 Davao Oriental
 Dinagat Islands
 Eastern Samar
 Guimaras
 Ifugao
 Ilocos Norte
 Ilocos Sur
 Iloilo
 Isabela
 Kalinga
 La Union
 Laguna
 Lanao del Norte
 Lanao del Sur
 Leyte
 Maguindanao del Norte
 Maguindanao del Sur
 Marinduque
 Masbate
 Misamis Occidental
 Misamis Oriental
 Mountain Province
 Negros Occidental
 Negros Oriental
 Northern Samar
 Nueva Ecija
 Nueva Vizcaya
 Occidental Mindoro
 Oriental Mindoro
 Palawan
 Pampanga
 Pangasinan
 Quezon
 Quirino
 Rizal
 Romblon
 Samar
 Sarangani
 Siquijor
 Sorsogon
 South Cotabato
 Southern Leyte
 Sultan Kudarat
 Sulu
 Surigao del Norte
 Surigao del Sur
 Tarlac
 Tawi-Tawi
 Zambales
 Zamboanga del Norte
 Zamboanga del Sur
 Zamboanga Sibugay

Cities of the Philippines 

 Alaminos
 Angeles
 Antipolo
 Bacolod
 Bacoor
 Bago
 Baguio
 Bais
 Balanga
 Batac
 Batangas City
 Bayawan
 Baybay
 Bayugan
 Biñan
 Bislig
 Bogo
 Borongan
 Butuan
 Cabadbaran
 Cabanatuan
 Cabuyao
 Cadiz
 Cagayan de Oro
 Calaca
 Calamba
 Calapan
 Calbayog
 Caloocan
 Candon
 Canlaon
 Carcar
 Catbalogan
 Cauayan
 Cavite City
 Cebu City
 Cotabato City
 Dagupan
 Danao
 Dapitan
 Dasmariñas
 Davao City
 Digos
 Dipolog
 Dumaguete
 El Salvador
 Escalante
 Gapan
 General Santos
 General Trias
 Gingoog
 Guihulngan
 Himamaylan
 Iligan
 Iloilo City
 Imus
 Iriga
 Isabela
 Kabankalan
 Kidapawan
 Koronadal
 La Carlota
 Lamitan
 Laoag
 Lapu-Lapu
 Las Piñas
 Legazpi
 Ligao
 Lipa
 Lucena
 Maasin
 Mabalacat
 Makati
 Malabon
 Malaybalay
 Malolos
 Mati
 Mandaluyong
 Mandaue
 Manila
 Marawi
 Marikina
 Masbate City
 Meycauayan
 Muñoz
 Muntinlupa
 Naga, Camarines Sur
 Naga, Cebu
 Navotas
 Olongapo
 Ormoc
 Oroquieta
 Ozamiz
 Pagadian
 Palayan
 Panabo
 Parañaque
 Pasay
 Pasig
 Passi
 Puerto Princesa
 Quezon City
 Roxas
 Sagay
 Samal
 San Carlos, Negros Occidental
 San Carlos, Pangasinan
 San Fernando, La Union
 San Fernando, Pampanga
 San Jose
 San Jose del Monte
 San Juan
 San Pablo
 San Pedro
 Santa Rosa
 Santiago
 Santo Tomas
 Silay
 Sipalay
 Sorsogon City
 Surigao City
 Tabaco
 Tacloban
 Tacurong
 Tagaytay
 Tagbilaran
 Taguig
 Tagum
 Talisay, Cebu
 Talisay, Negros Occidental
 Tanauan
 Tandag
 Tangub
 Tanjay
 Tarlac City
 Tayabas
 Toledo
 Trece Martires
 Tuguegarao
 Urdaneta
 Valencia
 Valenzuela
 Victorias
 Vigan
 Zamboanga City

Municipalities of the Philippines

Barangays of the Philippines

Demographics of the Philippines

Climate of the Philippines

History of the Philippines

Period-coverage 
 Prehistory of the Philippines
 Pre-colonial period
 Spanish colonial period
 American colonial period
 Post-colonial period
 Martial law era
 Contemporary period

Presidents of the Philippines 

 Emilio Aguinaldo: 1899–1901
 Manuel L. Quezon: 1935–1944
 Jose P. Laurel: 1943–1945
 Sergio Osmeña: 1944–1946
 Manuel Roxas: 1946–1948
 Elpidio Quirino: 1948–1953
 Ramon Magsaysay: 1953–1957
 Carlos P. Garcia: 1957–1961
 Diosdado Macapagal: 1961–1965
 Ferdinand Marcos: 1965–1986
 Corazon Aquino: 1986–1992
 Fidel V. Ramos: 1992–1998
 Joseph Estrada: 1998–2001
 Gloria Macapagal Arroyo: 2001–2010
 Benigno Aquino III: 2010–2016
 Rodrigo Duterte: 2016–2022
 Bongbong Marcos: 2022–present

Government and politics of the Philippines 

 Form of government: Unitary presidential constitutional republic
 Capital of the Philippines: Manila
 Flag of the Philippines
 Political parties in the Philippines
 Elections in the Philippines
 List of political parties in the Philippines
 Lakas–Christian Muslim Democrats (Lakas–CMD)
 Laban ng Demokratikong Pilipino (LDP)
 Liberal Party
 Nacionalista Party
 Nationalist People's Coalition
 National Unity Party (NUP)
 Partido Demokratiko Pilipino–Lakas ng Bayan (PDP–Laban)
 Pwersa ng Masang Pilipino (PMP)
 United Nationalist Alliance (UNA)

National government of the Philippines 

 Constitution of the Philippines

Legislative branch 

 Congress of the Philippines
 Senate of the Philippines
 President of the Senate of the Philippines
 President pro tempore of the Senate of the Philippines
 House of Representatives of the Philippines
 Speaker of the House of Representatives of the Philippines

Executive branch 

 Head of state and head of government: President of the Philippines, Bongbong Marcos (17th)
 Vice President of the Philippines: Sara Duterte (15th)

Executive departments 

 Department of Agrarian Reform
 Department of Agriculture
 Department of Budget and Management
 Department of Education
 Department of Energy
 Department of Environment and Natural Resources
 Department of Finance
 Department of Foreign Affairs
 Department of Health
 Department of Human Settlements and Urban Development
 Department of Information and Communications Technology
 Department of Justice
 Department of Labor and Employment
 Department of Migrant Workers
 Department of National Defense
 Department of Public Works and Highways
 Department of Science and Technology
 Department of Social Welfare and Development
 Department of the Interior and Local Government
 Department of Tourism
 Department of Trade and Industry
 Department of Transportation

Commissions 
 Civil Service Commission
 Commission on Appointments
 Commission on Audit
 Commission on Elections
 Commission on Filipino Migrant Workers
 Commission on Filipinos Overseas
 Commission on Higher Education
 Commission on Human Rights
 Constitutional Commission
 Consultative Commission on Charter Change
 Komisyon sa Wikang Filipino
 National Commission for Culture and the Arts
 National Commission on Indigenous Peoples
 National Historical Commission of the Philippines
 National Telecommunications Commission
 National Youth Commission
 Philippine Commission for the Urban Poor
 Philippine Commission on Justice and Peace
 Philippine Insurance Commission
 Philippine Sports Commission
 Population Commission
 Professional Regulation Commission
 Securities and Exchange Commission

Judicial branch 

 Supreme Court of the Philippines
 Chief Justice of the Supreme Court of the Philippines
 Associate Justice of the Supreme Court of the Philippines
 Court of Appeals
 Court of Tax Appeals
 Katarungang Pambarangay
 Ombudsman of the Philippines
 Regional Trial Courts
 Sandiganbayan

Local government in the Philippines

Foreign relations of the Philippines 

 Diplomatic missions in the Philippines
 Diplomatic missions of the Philippines

International organization membership

Military of the Philippines 

 Air Force of the Philippines
 Army of the Philippines
 Coast Guard of the Philippines
 Marine Corps of the Philippines
 Navy of the Philippines

Intelligence agencies 
 National Bureau of Investigation
 National Counter-Terrorism Action Group
 National Intelligence Coordinating Agency
 Philippine Drug Enforcement Agency

Law of the Philippines 

 Adoption in the Philippines

 Cannabis in the Philippines
 Capital punishment in the Philippines

 Census in the Philippines
 Censorship in the Philippines

 Child-related laws

 Child pornography laws in the Philippines

 Constitution of the Philippines
 Separation of church and state in the Philippines

 Copyright law in the Philippines

 Crime in the Philippines (Revised Penal Code)

 Rape in the Philippines

 Human rights in the Philippines
 Abortion in the Philippines
 Censorship in the Philippines

 Freedom of association in the Philippines

 Freedom of religion in the Philippines
 Freedom of speech in the Philippines
 Freedom of the press in the Philippines
 Gambling in the Philippines
 LGBT rights in the Philippines
 Marriage and union in the Philippines

 Marriage in the Philippines

 Divorce in the Philippines
 Same-sex marriage in the Philippines

 Prostitution in the Philippines

 Right to keep and bear arms
 Gun law in the Philippines

 Smoking in the Philippines

 Law enforcement in the Philippines
 Local ordinance

 Speed limits in the Philippines

 Taxation in the Philippines

Culture of the Philippines 

 Architecture of the Philippines
 Ancestral houses of the Philippines
 Charities in the Philippines
 Ethnic groups in the Philippines
 Spanish influence on Filipino culture
 Festivals in the Philippines
 Media in the Philippines
 Museums in the Philippines
 Mythology of the Philippines
 Mythical creatures in the Philippines
 National symbols of the Philippines
 Coat of arms of the Philippines
 Flag of the Philippines
 National anthem of the Philippines
 Public holidays in the Philippines
 Records of the Philippines
 Religion in the Philippines
 List of World Heritage Sites in the Philippines

Art in the Philippines 

 Art Deco theaters of the Philippines
 Cinema of the Philippines
 Literature of the Philippines
 Philippine literature in English
 Philippine literature in Spanish
 National Artist of the Philippines
 Television in the Philippines

Music of the Philippines 

 Folk music of the Philippines
 Philippine-based music groups

Languages of the Philippines 

 Philippine English
 Spanish language in the Philippines
 Philippine Spanish
 Philippine Sign Language
 Acronyms in the Philippines

Sports in the Philippines 

 Baseball in the Philippines
 Baseball Philippines
 Philippine national baseball team
 Basketball in the Philippines
 Maharlika Pilipinas Basketball League
 Metropolitan Basketball Association
 Mindanao Visayas Basketball Association
 National Basketball Conference
 Philippine Basketball Association
 Philippine Basketball League
 Philippine men's national basketball team
 Philippine women's national basketball team
 Samahang Basketbol ng Pilipinas
 United Regional Basketball League
 Boxing in the Philippines
 Amateur Boxing Association of the Philippines (ABAP)
 Football in the Philippines
 Philippine Football Federation
 Philippine national football team
 Philippine national football team (women)
 Filipino Martial Arts
 Philippines at the Olympics
 Philippine Olympic Committee
 Rugby in the Philippines
 Philippine national rugby union team
 Other
 Eskrima or Escrima
 Mano Mano
 National Collegiate Athletic Association
 Palarong Pambansa
 Panantukan
 National Athletic Association of Schools, Colleges and Universities
 Philippine Sports Association for the Differently Abled—National Paralympic Committee of the Philippines
 Philippine Sports Commission
 Triathlon Association of the Philippines
 University Athletic Association of the Philippines

Education in the Philippines 

 Science and technology in the Philippines

Economy and infrastructure of the Philippines 

 Economic rank, by nominal GDP (2007): 46th (forty-sixth)
 Agriculture in the Philippines
 Banking in the Philippines
 Central Bank of the Philippines
 Companies of the Philippines
 Currency of Philippines: Peso *
 ISO 4217: PHP
 Philippine peso bills
 Fiscal policy of the Philippines
 Mining in the Philippines
 Shopping malls in the Philippines
 Philippine Government Securities
 Philippine Stock Exchange
 Taxation in the Philippines
 Revenue stamps of the Philippines
 Tourism in the Philippines
 Water supply and sanitation in the Philippines

Energy in the Philippines 

 Electricity distribution
 National Power Corporation
 Energy policy of the Philippines
 Oil industry in the Philippines
 Power plants in the Philippines
 Nuclear energy in the Philippines
 Geothermal power in the Philippines
 Wind power in the Philippines

Transportation in the Philippines 

 Airports in the Philippines
 Lighthouses in the Philippines
 Rail transportation in the Philippines
 Vehicular transport in the Philippines
 Road system in the Philippines
 Philippine expressway network
 Philippine highway network
 Vehicles in the Philippines
 Bus companies of the Philippines
 Cars of the Philippines
 Jeepney
 Philippine vehicle license plates

See also 

List of international rankings
Member states of the Association of Southeast Asian Nations
Member states of the Latin Union
Member states of the United Nations
Outline of Asia
Outline of geography
Outline of Metro Manila

Notes

References

External links 

Philippine Wikipedias (Incubator Status)
 Aklan language (:incubator:Wp/akl)
 Miraya Bikol language (:incubator:Wp/rbl)
 Pandan Bikol language (:incubator:Wp/cts)
 Rinconada Bikol language (:incubator:Wp/bto)
 Capiznon language (:incubator:Wp/cps)
 Hiligaynon language (:incubator:Wp/hil)
 Kinaray-a language (:incubator:Wp/krj)
 Maranao language (:incubator:Wp/mrw)
 Tausug language (:incubator:Wp/tsg)

Philippine Wikimedia (Incubator Status)
 Bikol Wiktionary
 Cebuano Wiktionary
 Kapampangan Wiktionary
 Pangasinan Wiktionary
 Tagalog Wikinews
 Tagalog Wikivoyage
 Waray Wiktionary

 Official
 Official website of the Philippine Government – Portal to governmental sites

 Maps
 WikiSatellite view of Philippines at WikiMapia

 Other

 WOW Philippines Tourism Ad
 Around Philippines Photos
 Washington Post: How the Philippines Sees America
 
 BBC Country Profile on the Philippines
 CIA World Factbook: Philippines
 U.S. Country Studies: Philippines
 Philippines Daily Photos
 Origins of the Filipinos and Their Languages by Wilhelm G. Solheim II (PDF)
 History of the Philippine Islands in many volumes, from Project Gutenberg (and indexed under Emma Helen Blair, the general editor)
 USAID country health statistical report: Philippines (May 2008)

Philippines